Madeleine Rosca (born Madeleine Bensley; 1977) is an Australian artist and author. She also writes Rise from Ashes, a supernatural webcomic series.

Biography 

She grew up in country Victoria and earned a Bachelor of Arts in Visual Arts from Monash University. She also received qualifications from Swinburne University (multimedia) and the University of Tasmania (information management). She currently resides in Hobart, Tasmania. Rosca is best known for her all-ages manga, Hollow Fields, which is published by Seven Seas Entertainment. She was singled out for special mention in a November 2007 article in Wired on the history of manga in America.

Works 

Rosca has published four volumes on her series Hollow Fields, and two volumes of the series called Clockwork Sky. She is also currently working on a webcomic named Rise from Ashes.

Awards 

Rosca was one of four winners presented with Japan's inaugural "International Manga Award" for her work on Hollow Fields.

References

External links 
 Hollow Fields at Gomanga
 Artist's Twitter

People from Hobart
Australian women artists
Australian female comics artists
Australian comics artists
1977 births
Living people
Female comics writers